The Charlie Barley Stakes is a Canadian Thoroughbred horse race run annually in early July at Woodbine Racetrack in Toronto, Ontario. Therace is open to three-year-old horses and is contested on turf over a distance of one mile (eight furlongs).

Inaugurated in 2001, it was raced at a distance of one and one sixteenth miles in the first year. The race is named for the 1989 Canadian Champion Male Turf Horse, Charlie Barley.

Records
Speed  record:
 1:33.02 - Dalavin (2004)

Most wins by an owner:
 2 - Sam-Son Farm (2001, 2002)

Most wins by a jockey:
 5 - Patrick Husbands (2003, 2004, 2006, 2012. 2016)

Most wins by a trainer:
 5 - Mark Casse (2006, 2010, 2011, 2013, 2016)

Winners

(*Sky Commander won when Golden Sabre was disqualified)

References

Ungraded stakes races in Canada
Flat horse races for three-year-olds
Turf races in Canada
Recurring sporting events established in 2001
Woodbine Racetrack